Brachium (plural brachia) may refer to:
 The arm or the upper arm
 The traditional name of the star Sigma Librae
 Brachium of inferior colliculus, part of the brain
 Brachium of superior colliculus, part of the brain
 Brachia conjunctiva, part of the brain

See also 
 Antebrachium, the forearm
 Parabrachial area
 Medial parabrachial nucleus
 Lateral parabrachial nucleus